The Nationalist faction or Rebel faction was a major faction in the Spanish Civil War of 1936 to 1939. It was composed of a variety of right-leaning political groups that supported the Spanish Coup of July 1936 against the Second Spanish Republic and Republican faction and sought to depose Manuel Azaña, including the Falange, the CEDA, and two rival monarchist claimants: the Alfonsist Renovación Española and the Carlist Traditionalist Communion. In 1937, all the groups were merged into the FET y de las JONS. After the death of the faction's early leaders, General Francisco Franco, one of the members of the 1936 coup, would head the Nationalists throughout most of the war and emerge as the dictator of Spain until his death in 1975.

The term Nationalists or Nationals was coined by Joseph Goebbels following the visit of the clandestine Spanish delegation led by Captain Francisco Arranz requesting war material on 24 July 1936, in order to give a cloak of legitimacy to Nazi Germany's help to the Spanish rebel military. The leaders of the rebel faction, who had already been denominated as 'Crusaders' by Bishop of Salamanca Enrique Pla y Deniel—and also used the term Cruzada for their campaign—immediately took a liking to it.
 
The term Bando nacional—much as the term rojos (Reds) to refer to the loyalists—is considered by some authors as a term linked with the propaganda of that faction. Throughout the civil war the term 'National' was mainly used by the members and supporters of the rebel faction, while its opponents used the terms fascistas (fascists) or facciosos (sectarians) to refer to this faction.

Belligerents
The military rebellion found wide areas of support both inside Spain and in the international sphere. In Spain the Francoist side was mainly supported by the predominantly conservative upper class, liberal professionals, religious organizations and land-owning farmers. It was mostly based in the rural areas where progressive political movements had made few inroads, such as great swathes of the Northern Meseta, including almost all of Old Castile, as well as La Rioja, Navarre, Alava, the area near Zaragoza in Aragon, most of Galicia, parts of Cáceres in Extremadura and many dispersed pockets in rural Andalusia where the local society still followed ancient traditional patterns and was yet untouched by "modern" thought.

Political groups
Politically this faction rallied together various parties and organizations which in some cases espoused opposed ideologies, such as the  conservative CEDA and Alejandro Lerroux's radicals (liberals), as well as Falangists, Catholics and pro-Monarchic movements such as the Agraristas and the Carlistas (Requetés).

Falange

The Falange Española was originally a Spanish fascist political party founded by José Antonio Primo de Rivera, son of the former Spanish leader Miguel Primo de Rivera. The Falange was created with the financial assistance of Alfonsist monarchist funding. Upon being formed, the Falange was officially anti-clerical and anti-monarchist. As a landowner and aristocrat, Primo de Rivera assured the upper classes that Spanish fascism would not get out of their control like its equivalents in Germany and Italy. In 1934, the Falange merged with the pro-Nazi Juntas de Ofensiva Nacional-Sindicalista of Ramiro Ledesma Ramos, to form the Falange Española de las JONS.

Initially, the Falange was short of funds and was a small student-based movement that preached of a utopian violent nationalist revolution. The Falange committed acts of violence prior to the war, including becoming involved in street brawls with their political opponents that helped to create a state of lawlessness that the right-wing press blamed on the republic to support a military uprising. Falangist terror squads sought to create an atmosphere of disorder in order to justify the imposition of an authoritarian regime. With the onset of middle-class disillusionment with the CEDA's legalism, support for the Falange expanded rapidly. By September 1936, the total Falangist volunteers numbered at 35,000, accounting for 55 percent of all civilian forces of the Nationals.

Falange Española de las JONS was one of the original supporters of the military coup d'état against the republic, the other being the Carlists. After the death of José Antonio Primo de Rivera, Manuel Hedilla sought to take control of the Falange, but this was usurped by Franco who sought to take control of the movement as part of his move to take control of the National faction. In 1937, Franco announced a decree of unification of the National political movements, particularly the Falange and the Carlists into a single movement, nominally still the Falange, under his leadership, under the name Falange Española Tradicionalista y de las JONS. Both Falangists and Carlists were initially furious at the decision, Falangists in particular saw their ideological role as being usurped by the Catholic Church and their revolution being indefinitely postponed.

Upon unification and seizure of leadership by Franco, Franco distanced the party from fascism and declared "The Falange does not consider itself fascist; its founder said so personally." After this announcement, the practice in the National faction of referring to the Falange as "fascists" disappeared by 1937, but Franco did not deny that there were fascists within the Falange. Franco declared that the Falange's goal was to incorporate the "great neutral mass of the unaffiliated", and promised that no ideological rigidity would be allowed to interfere with the goal. Under Franco's leadership, the Falange abandoned the previous anticlerical tendencies of José Antonio Primo de Rivera and instead promoted neotraditionalist National Catholicism, though it continued to criticize Catholic pacifism. Franco's Falange also abandoned hostility to capitalism, with Falange member Raimundo Fernández-Cuesta declaring that Falange's national syndicalism was fully compatible with capitalism.

CEDA

The Spanish Confederation of Autonomous Right-wing Groups, CEDA, was a Catholic right-wing political organization dedicated to anti-Marxism.  The CEDA was led by José María Gil-Robles y Quiñones. The CEDA claimed that it was defending Spain and "Christian civilization" from Marxism, and claimed that the political atmosphere in Spain had made politics a matter of Marxism versus anti-Marxism. With the advent of the rise of the Nazi Party to power in Germany, the CEDA aligned itself with similar propaganda ploys to the Nazis, including the Nazi emphasis on authority, the fatherland, and hierarchy. Gil-Robles attended in audience at the Nazi Party rally in Nuremberg and was influenced by it, henceforth becoming committed to creating a single anti-Marxist counterrevolutionary front in Spain. Gil-Robles declared his intention to "give Spain a true unity, a new spirit, a totalitarian polity..." and went on to say "Democracy is not an end but a means to the conquest of the new state. When the time comes, either parliament submits or we will eliminate it." The CEDA held fascist-style rallies, called Gil-Robles "Jefe", the equivalent of Duce, and claimed that the CEDA might lead a "March on Madrid" to forcefully seize power. The CEDA failed to make the substantive electoral gains from 1931 to 1936 that were needed for it to form government which resulted in right-wing support draining from it and turning towards the belligerent Alfonsist monarchist leader José Calvo Sotelo. Subsequently, the CEDA abandoned its moderation and legalism and began providing support for those committed to violence against the republic, including handing over its electoral funds to the initial leader of the military coup against the republic, General Emilio Mola. Subsequently, supporters of the CEDA's youth movement, Juventudes de Acción Popular (JAP) began to defect en masse to join the Falange, and the JAP ceased to exist as a political organisation in 1937.

Monarchists

Carlists

The Carlists were monarchists and ardent ultratraditionalist Catholics who sought the installation of Carlist Pretender Francisco Javier de Borbón as King of Spain. The Carlists were anti-republican, anti-democratic and staunchly anti-socialist. The Carlists were so anti-socialist that they opposed both Hitler and Mussolini because of their socialist tendencies. The Carlists were led by Manuel Fal Condé and held their main base of support in Navarre. The Carlists along with the Falange were the original supporters of the military coup d'état against the republic.  The Carlists held a long history of violent opposition to Spanish liberalism, stemming back to 1833 when they launched a six-year civil war against the reformist regency of María Cristina de las dos Sicilias. The Carlists were strongly intransigent to any coalition with other movements, even believing that no non-Carlist could have honest intentions.

During the war, the Carlists' militia, the Requetés reached a peak of 42,000 recruits but by the end of hostilities in April 1939 their overall strength had been reduced to 23,000. The Carlists contributed some of the Nationalists' most effective shock troops during the war.

Alfonsists 

The Alfonsists were a movement that supported the restoration of Alfonso XIII of Spain as monarch following the founding of the Spanish Second Republic in 1931. They competed with rival monarchists, the Carlists, for the Spanish throne. After the overthrow of the monarchy of Alfonso XIII, Alfonsist supporters formed the Renovación Española, a monarchist political party, which held considerable economic influence and had close supporters in the Spanish army. Renovación Española did not, however, manage to become a mass political movement.  In 1934, the Alfonsists, led by Antonio Goicoechea, along with the Carlists, met with Italian dictator Benito Mussolini to gain support for an uprising against the republic, in which Mussolini promised to provide money and arms for such a rising. From 1934 to 1936, the charismatic Alfonsist leader José Calvo Sotelo spoke of the need for the "conquest of the state" as the only means to secure the establishment of an ideal authoritarian, corporatist state. Sotelo made passionate speeches in support of violent counterrevolution and emphasized the need for a military insurrection against the republic to counter the threats of communism and separatism that he blamed as being caused by the republic. Sotelo was kidnapped and assassinated by political opponents (who were initially searching out Gil-Robles of the CEDA to kidnap) on 13 July 1936 which sparked fury on the political right and helped legitimize the military coup against the republic.

When the war broke out, Infante Juan, the son of Alfonso XIII and heir to the Spanish throne, requested the permission of Franco to take part in the Nationals' war effort by enlisting as a member of the crew of the cruiser Balaeres, which was nearing completion. He promised to abstain from political activities, but Franco refused, believing that he would become a figurehead for the Alfonsists who held a strong presence in the military.

Military

Army of Africa

The Army of Africa was a field army garrisoned in Spanish Morocco – a legacy of the Rif War – under the command of General Francisco Franco. It consisted of the Spanish Foreign Legion and the Regulares, infantry and cavalry units recruited from the population of Spanish Morocco and with Spanish officers as commanders.

The Regulares operated as the shock troops of the National forces in exchange for a substantial pay. More than 13,000 Moroccan troops were airlifted on 20 Junkers Ju 52 planes supplied by Hitler between the beginning of the conflict in July and October 1936. Their proverbial cruelty and reckless behaviour were not random, but were part of a calculated plan of the Francoist military leaders in order to instill terror in the Republican defence lines.

The Army of Africa would be the most decorated unit in the May 1939 victory brigade by the Nationalists; it has been estimated that one in five of its members were killed during the war, a casualty rate twice as high as that of the Spanish. For several years after the war, Franco would have a squadron of Moorish troops act as his escort at public ceremonies as a reminder of the Army's importance in the Nationalist victory.

Civil Guard

Approximately 47% of the Spanish Republican Civil Guard defected to the rebels during the onset of the civil war. With the highest authority of the Spanish Republican Civil Guard, Inspector General Sebastián Pozas, remaining loyal to the republican government, the rebel units of the Civil Guard were placed under direct command of the Nationalist army until after the war ended.

Foreign support

Italy

Italy under the Fascist leadership of Benito Mussolini supported the overthrow of the republic and the establishment of a regime that would serve as a client state to Italy. Italy distrusted the Spanish Republic due to its pro-French leanings and prior to the war had made contact with Spanish right-wing groups.  Italy justified its intervention as an action intended to prevent the rise of Bolshevism in Spain. Italy's Fascist regime considered the threat of Bolshevism a real risk with the arrival of volunteers from the Soviet Union who were fighting for the Republicans. Mussolini provided financial support as well as training to the Alfonsists, Carlists, and Falange. Mussolini met Falangist leader José Antonio Primo de Rivera in 1933 but did not have much enthusiasm in the establishment of fascism in Spain at that time.

By January 1937, an expeditionary force of 35,000 Italians, the Corpo Truppe Volontarie, were in Spain under the command of General Mario Roatta. The contingent was made up of four divisions: Littorio, Dio lo Vuole ("God Wills it"), Fiamme Nere ("Black Flames") and Penne Nere ("Black Feathers"). The first of these divisions was made up of soldiers; the other three of Blackshirt volunteers. Italy provided the National forces with fighter and bomber aircraft which played a significant part in the war. In March 1937, Italy intervened in the political affairs of the Nationals by sending Roberto Farinacci to Spain to urge Franco to unite the National political movements into one fascist "Spanish National Party".

Germany

Nazi Germany provided the Nationals with material, specialists, and a powerful air force contingent, the Condor Legion German expeditionary forces that provided airlift of soldiers and material from Spanish Africa to Peninsular Spain and provided offensive operations against Republican forces. Nationalist forces were supplied with tanks and aircraft, including the Panzer I, Messerschmitt Bf 109 and Heinkel He 111. The Spanish Civil War would provide an ideal testing ground for the proficiency of the new weapons produced during the German re-armament. Many aeronautical bombing techniques were tested by the Condor Legion against the Republican Government on Spanish soil with the permission of Generalísimo Franco. Hitler insisted, however, that his long-term designs were peaceful, a strategy labelled as "Blumenkrieg" (Flower War).

Germany had important economic interests at stake in Spain, as Germany imported large amounts of mineral ore from Spanish Morocco. The Nazi regime sent retired General Wilhelm Faupel as ambassador to Franco's regime, Faupel supported Franco and the Falange in the hope that they would create a Nazi-like regime in Spain. Debt owed by Franco and the Nationals to Germany rose quickly upon purchasing German material, and required financial assistance from Germany as the Republicans had access to Spain's gold reserve.

Portugal 

Upon the outbreak of the civil war, Portuguese Prime Minister António de Oliveira Salazar almost immediately supported the National forces. Salazar's Estado Novo regime held tense relations with the Spanish Republic that held Portuguese dissidents to his regime in it. Portugal played a critical role in supplying Franco's forces with ammunition and many other logistical resources.
Despite its discreet direct military involvement – restrained to a somewhat "semi-official" endorsement, by its authoritarian regime, of an 8,000–12,000-strong volunteer force, the so-called "Viriatos" – for the whole duration of the conflict, Portugal was instrumental in providing the National faction with a vital logistical organization and by reassuring Franco and his allies that no interference whatsoever would hinder the supply traffic directed to the Nationals, crossing the borders of the two Iberian countries – the Nationals used to refer to Lisbon as "the port of Castile". In 1938, with Franco's victory increasingly certain, Portugal recognized Franco's regime and after the war in 1939 signed a treaty of friendship and non-aggression pact that was known as the Iberian Pact. Portugal played an important diplomatic role in supporting the Franco regime, including by insisting to the United Kingdom that Franco sought to replicate Salazar's Estado Novo and not Mussolini's Fascist Italy.

Holy See 

Among many influential Catholics in Spain, mainly composed of conservative Traditionalists and people belonging to pro-Monarchic groups, the religious persecution was squarely and based on evidence probably rightly mostly blamed on the government of the Republic. The ensuing outrage was used after the 1936 coup by the nationalist/monarchist faction and readily extended itself. The Catholic Church took the side of the rebel government and defined the religious Spaniards who had been persecuted in Republican areas as 'martyrs of the faith'. The devout Catholics who supported the Spanish Republic included high-ranking officers of the Popular Army such as republican Catholic general Vicente Rojo Lluch, as well as the Catholic Basque nationalists who opposed the rebel faction.

Initially the Vatican held itself from declaring too openly its support of the rebel side in the war, although it had long allowed high ecclesiastical figures in Spain to do so and to define the conflict as a 'Crusade'. Throughout the war, however, Francoist propaganda and influential Spanish Catholics labelled the secular Republic as "the enemy of God and the Church" and denounced the Republic, holding it responsible for anti-clerical activities such as shutting down Catholic schools and the desecration of religious buildings, as well as the killing of priests and nuns by frenzied mobs.

Forsaken by the Western European powers, the republican side mainly depended from Soviet military assistance, which played into the hands of the portrayal of the Spanish Republic as a 'Marxist' and godless state in the Francoist propaganda. By means of its extensive diplomatic network the Holy See used its influence to lobby for the rebel side. During an International Art Exhibition in Paris in 1937, in which both the Francoist and the Republican governments were present, the Holy See allowed the Nationalist pavilion to display its exhibition under the Vatican flag, for the rebel government's flag was still not recognized.
By 1938, the Holy See had already officially recognized Franco's Spanish State, being one of the first to do so.

Regarding the position of the Holy See during and after the Civil War, Manuel Montero, lecturer of the University of the Basque Country commented on 6 May 2007:

Other supporters 

1,000 to 2,000 English, Irish, French, Filipino, White Russians, Polish, Romanian, Hungarian, and Belgian volunteers came to Spain to fight on the side of the Nationals. Only two British women Priscilla Scott-Ellis and Gabriel Herbert voluteered as nurses.

See also 
 Republican faction (Spanish Civil War)
 Spanish Republican Armed Forces

Notes

References

Bibliography 

 
 Alpert, Michael. A New International History of the Spanish Civil War. Paperback edition. Hampshire and London: Macmillan Press Ltd, 1997; New York: St. Martin's Press Ltd, 1997.
 Beevor, Antony. The Battle for Spain; The Spanish Civil War, 1936–1939. Weidenfeld & Nicolson, 2006.
 
 Casanova, Juliàn. The Spanish Republic and Civil War. Cambridge University Press, 2010.
 Davis, Paul K. Besieged: an encyclopedia of great sieges from ancient times to the present. Santa Barbara, California: ABC-CLIO, Inc, 2001.
 Gallagher, Tom. Portugal: a twentieth-century interpretation. Manchester, England: Manchester University Press, 1983.
 
 De Meneses, Filipe Ribeiro . Franco and the Spanish Civil War. London; New York: Routledge, 2001.
 Payne, Stanley G. Fascism in Spain, 1923–1977. Madison: Wisconsin University Press, 1999.
 Preston, Paul. The Spanish Civil War: Reaction, Revolution & Revenge. 3rd edition. New York: Norton & Company, Inc, 2007.
 
 Turnbull, Patrick. The Spanish Civil War, 1936–39. 6th edition. Oxford; New York: Osprey Publishing, 2005.

External links 
 Los historiadores, contra Margallo por negarse a abrir los archivos

Spanish Civil War
Anti-communism in Spain
Fascism in Spain
Far-right politics